The Banate of Belgrade was a frontier province (banate) of the medieval Kingdom of Hungary, centered in Belgrade (modern Serbia). During the second half of the 15th century, and up to 1521, it had a significant role in the anti-Ottoman defensive system of the Kingdom of Hungary.

History

Prior to 1427, Belgrade had been the capital of the Serbian Despotate. After Serbian despot Stefan Lazarević died in the summer of 1427, his successor Đurađ Branković was forced to transfer Belgrade to the Kingdom of Hungary and to move his capital to Smederevo.

At first, Hungarian kings created the Captaincy of Belgrade, headed by a military commander (captain) in charge of the frontier region (lat. capitaneus belgradensis, or capitaneus nandoralbensis). In 1440, Belgrade was besieged by Ottomans, but the city was successfully defended. 

In 1456, the Ottoman army tried to conquer Belgrade for the second time, but failed again. 

After the annexation of the Serbian Despotate by the Ottomans in 1459, further Ottoman expansion was directed towards Captaincy of Belgrade and neighboring Banate of Mačva. 

By the end of the 15th century, captains of Belgrade were replaced by bans (lat. banus belgradensis, or banus nandoralbensis), and thus the Banate of Belgrade was created. Ban of Belgrade also had a deputy, titled viceban of Belgrade. Finally, in 1521, the Ottoman army conquered Belgrade, which also marked the end of the Banate of Belgrade, and the region was subsequently incorporated into the Ottoman Sanjak of Smederevo. 

Among more notable captains and bans of Belgrade were: Matko Talovac, Jovan Talovac, Michael Szilágyi, Peter Dóczy, Lawrence of Ilok.

See also
 History of Belgrade
 History of Serbia
 Banate of Mačva

References

Sources

External links
 About the Banate of Belgrade (in Hungarian)
 Banate of Belgrade in 1490 - map

Banates of the Kingdom of Hungary
15th century in Serbia
16th century in Serbia
Serbian Despotate
History of Belgrade
Šumadija